Hattie or Hatty may refer to:

People
Hattie Alexander (1901–1968), American pediatrician and microbiologist
Hattie Helen Gould Beck, birth name of burlesque dancer Sally Rand (1904–1979)
Hattie Bessent (1908–2015), American psychiatric nurse
Hattie Beverly (1874–1904), first African-American schoolteacher in Grand Rapids, Michigan
Hattie Canty (1933–2012), African-American labor activist
Hattie Caraway (1878–1950), first female United States senator
Hattie Carnegie (1889–1956), American clothing and jewelry designer
Hattie Carthan (1901–1984), community activist in New York
Hattie B. Gooding (1877 - 1938), American publicity agent
Hattie Gossett, African-American feminist writer
Hattie Hart, American Memphis blues singer and songwriter
Hattie N. Harrison (born 1928), American politician
Hattie Hayridge (born 1959), British stand-up comedian and actress
Hattie Jacques (1922–1980), English comedy actress
Hattie Johnson (born 1981), American Olympic shooter
Hatty Jones (born 1988), British child actress in the 1998 movie Madeline
Hattie Lawton (c. 1837–?), American Civil War Union spy and detective in Pinkerton's Female Detective Bureau
Hattie Leslie (allegedly born Libbie Spahn) (1868–1892), American female boxer
Hattie McDaniel (1895–1952), American actress, the first black performer to win an Academy Award
Hattie Morahan (born 1978), award-winning English actress
Hattie Peterson (1930–2017), a pitcher in the All-American Girls Professional Baseball League
Hattie Saussy (1890–1978), American painter
Hattie Williams (1870–1942), American stage actress, comedian and singer
Hattie Winston (born 1945), American actress best known as Margaret in Becker
Hattie Kragten, Canadian actress

Fictional characters
Hattie Durham, flight attendant in the Left Behind series
Hattie McDoogal, in the animated television series Futurama
Hattie Tavernier, in the BBC soap opera EastEnders during the 1990s
Hattie Brooks, protagonist of Hattie Big Sky, a children's novel by Kirby Larson
Hattie, protagonist of Hattie and the Wild Waves, a 1990 book by Barbara Cooney
Hattie, in Tom's Midnight Garden
Hattie the Witch, a recurring character in the animated television series Wallykazam!
Battie Hattie From Cincinnati, a puppet by Larry Smith (puppeteer), also called "Hattie the witch"

Other
Hattie (film), TV film about Hattie Jacques
Hattie (elephant) (died 1922), an elephant in New York City's Central Park Zoo

See also
Hetty (disambiguation), also including Hettie